Love & Life is the sixth studio album by American R&B recording artist Mary J. Blige. It was released by Geffen Records on August 26, 2003. The album marked Blige's debut on the Geffen label, following the absorption of her former record company MCA Records. In addition, it saw her reuniting with Sean "Diddy" Combs, executive producer of her first two studio albums What's the 411? (1992) and My Life (1994), who wrote and executive produced most of Love & Life with his Bad Boy in-house production team The Hitmen, including Mario Winans, D-Dot, and Stevie J.

Love & Life was released to positive reception from music critics, who applauded Blige's vocal performances and her collaboration with Combs on most of the songs. Commercially, it became her second album to debut at the top of the US Billboard 200 chart with 285,298 copies. Though less successful than its predecessor No More Drama (2001), the album was eventually certified platinum by the RIAA. Internationally, it entered the top ten in Canada, Sweden, Switzerland, and the United Kingdom. Love & Life also received numerous accolades, earning Blige her first nomination for Best Contemporary R&B Album at the 46th Grammy ceremony.

In support of the album, five singles from the album were released. Lead single "Love @ 1st Sight", a collaboration with rapper Method Man, and second single "Ooh!" both reached the top thirty of the US Billboard 100 chart and peaked within the top forty on most charts they appeared on. "Not Today" featuring rapper Eve, "Whenever I Say Your Name", a duet with singer Sting, and final single "It's a Wrap" were less successful. In April and May 2004, Blige promoted Love & Life in her Love & Life concert tour, which visited several cities throughout the United States.

Background
Citing creative differences, Blige and Combs parted ways after the release of her multi-platinum second album My Life (1994). The pair reconnected in 2001, when Combs was consulted to produce a remix for Blige's single "No More Drama" from her album of the same name. Combs declared Love & Life a continuation of My Life.

Critical reception

Love & Life received generally positive reviews from critics. At Metacritic, which assigns a normalized rating out of 100 to reviews from mainstream publications, the album received an average score of 72, based on 10 reviews. AllMusic editor Andy Kellman wrote that while the positive attitude of Love & Life creates a "distance that holds the album back from being one of her best [...] at least half a dozen cuts will vie for slots on a future best-of". Rolling Stone writer Ernest Hardy believed that with Love & Life, Blige "solidifies her standing as the hood Oprah, offering songs of faith and affirmation [...] Her lyrics are confessional, with scant use of metaphor or simile, and little of the creative risk-taking of poetry – the point with Blige is relating, not memorable tunes." Michael Paoletta from Billboard found the album "spirited, if uneven", and noted that it was "home to funky sensations, hip-hop attitude, and loved-up lyrics". Vibe editor Dimitri Ehrlich wrote that on Blige's "sixth studio album, it's the songs of sadness and anger that work best." In The Village Voice, Robert Christgau argued that the album's "selling point is a reborn P. Diddy overseeing a catchy set husbanded by many co-producers. It peaks in the middle, and ... ends stronger than No More Drama. Up against What's the 411? Mary sounds older yet still girlish, rounder and smoother and pitch-improved but praise Shirley Brown not perfect yet."

Neil Drumming was more critical in Entertainment Weekly, focusing on the abundance of melancholy-heavy ballads and Combs' decision to rely on heavy sampling for most tracks, which he called "shallow, trebly echoes of their former selves". "Despite her signature heartache-inducing voice", Blige could not "save Love & Life from her heavy-handed songwriting", Drumming wrote, finding the lyrics "soggy with relationships" and lacking subtlety. Jonah Weiner of Blender commented that "practically every song sounds as though we've heard it before – because, well, we have". Q panned the record as mostly "a procession of syrupy ballads with added self-help litanies".

Commercial performance
 
In the United States, Love & Life debuted at number one on the Billboard 200 albums chart, selling 285,298 copies in first week. It became Blige's second number-one album on the chart, following 1997's Share My World. The album also opened at the top spot on Billboards R&B/Hip-Hop Albums chart, marking Blige's sixth consecutive album to top the latter chart. MTV News noted that this feat lifted Blige "among music's most consistent artists on the albums chart," since from "her last four albums, three debuted in the top two slots, and the fourth took number nine. All of Blige's three most recent releases "each sold between 240,000 and 294,000 copies in the weeks they debuted". In October 2003, Love & Life was eventually certified platinum by the Recording Industry Association of America (RIAA) for the shipping of one million copies. At 994,000 sold units, however, it was temporarily ranked as Blige's lowest-selling studio release at that time – until the release of her album Stronger with Each Tear in 2009.

In the United Kingdom, Love & Life became Blige's fourth consecutive album to reach the top ten of the UK Albums Chart, debuting at number eight. In November 2003, it was certified silver by British Phonographic Industry (BPI), indicating sales of more than 60,000 units. Elsewhere, the album reached the top twenty in Denmark, France, Norway, and the Wallonian region of Belgium, and peaked at number six on the Canadian Albums Chart. Love & Life also entered the top three in Sweden and Switzerland, where it ranks among Blige's highest-charting albums as of 2016.

Accolades and impact
Love & Life and its singles earned Blige numerous awards and nominations. At the 46th Grammy Awards, the album received a nomination for Best Contemporary R&B Album, losing to Beyoncé's Dangerously in Love. Meanwhile, the album's second single, "Ooh!" received a nomination for Best Female R&B Vocal Performance, also losing to "Dangerously in Love 2" by Beyoncé. The album's international fourth single, the Sting-featured "Whenever I Say Your Name" won a Grammy Award for Best Pop Collaboration with Vocals. The same year, Love & Life received a Best Female R&B/Soul Album nod at the 2004 Soul Train Music Awards, though it again lost to Dangerously in Love.

Despite its critical success, media journalists considered Love & Life a disappointment since it failed to duplicate the combined commercial success of previous album No More Drama (2001) and its parent singles such as "Family Affair" and "No More Drama". Blige later expressed discontent with the success of the project, citing both Combs's dominant role and the large group of collaborators on the project as pivotal. In a 2006 interview with Billboard, the singer stated that she "knew that Love & Life was something that disappointed [the fans]. None us where in a good place. Too many cooks spoiled the soup. You had [Diddy] saying 'Do this, do that' and I wanted something else". Blige also criticized record company executives for stepping in the recording process. In 2013, while commenting on her musical catalogue, she further remarked: "Love & Life was confusion and we didn’t know what the heck we were doing."

Track listing

Notes
 denotes co-producer.

Sample credits
 "Love & Life Intro" contains excerpts from "Morning Song", written by Les McCann.
 "Don't Go" contains a sample from "The Long Goodbye", performed by Lou Donaldson.
 "When We" contains a sample from "I Want You", performed by Marvin Gaye.
 "Finally Made It" contains a sample from "Better Days", performed by Rufus and Chaka Khan.
 "Ooh!" contains a sample from "Singing a Song for My Mother", performed by Bohannon.
 "Let Me Be the 1" contains a sample from "I'll Bet You", performed by Funkadelic.
 "Love @ 1st Sight" contains a sample from "Hot Sex", performed by A Tribe Called Quest.
 "Willing & Waiting" contains a sample from "When Love Calls", performed by Atlantic Starr.
 "Friends" contains a sample from "Mellow Mood Part I", performed by Barry White.
 "Press On" contains excerpts from "Summer Breeze", performed by Seals and Crofts.
 "Message in Our Music" contains a sample from "Summer Madness", performed by Kool & the Gang.
 "All My Love" contains excerpts from "Never My Love", performed by The Association.
 "Didn't Mean" contains excerpts from "Find a Way", performed by A Tribe Called Quest.

Charts

Weekly charts

Year-end charts

Certifications

See also
List of Billboard 200 number-one albums of 2003
List of Billboard number-one R&B albums of 2003

References

External links
 Official website

2003 albums
Mary J. Blige albums
Albums produced by Sean Combs
Albums produced by Dr. Dre
Albums produced by Theron Feemster
Interscope Geffen A&M Records albums